Skaboom! is an album released by The Toasters originally in 1987 and re-released on a CD in June of 1995. The 1995 released featured an additional eight bonus tracks. The album is often stated as being the origin of modern, or "third-wave" ska in the United States.

Track listing
 "Talk Is Cheap" -3:50
 "Pool Shark" -3:47
 "Weekend in L.A." -4:22
 "Shocker!" -4:31
 "Toast on the Coast" -2:11
 "Manipulator" -3:30
 "Mr. Trouble" -3:24
 "ABC's" 2:54
 "East Side Beat" -3:45
 "Now or Never" -3:19
 "So Long, Buck" -1:16
Reissue Bonus Tracks
 "Renee" -4:07
 "Matt Davis" -2:45
 "Ideal Man" -3:22
 "Naked City" -3:14
Tracks 12-15 from the 1987 UK-only album release Pool Shark
 "Recrimination" -3:15
 "Razor Cut" -3:37
 "Run Rudy Run" -4:14
 "Radiation Skank" -2:07
Tracks 16-19 from the EP Recriminiations, recorded May 1985 & Produced by Joe Jackson (aka Stanley Turpentine)

External links
 Skaboom at MusicBrainz
SKABOOM

Skaboom
Skaboom